Clinotarsus alticola is a species of frog in the family Ranidae. Common names for this species include: Assam Hills frog, Annandale's frog, pointed-headed frog, palebrown stream frog, hill frog, point-nosed frog, and high-altitude frog. It is found in Hills of Meghalaya and northeastern India (Assam, Meghalaya, Mizoram, Nagaland, Tripura, and West Bengal) to northern Bangladesh, possibly into Bhutan and Nepal.

Habitat
Clinotarsus alticola inhabit evergreen forests near large streams (the habitat for their tadpoles) in hill areas, usually near waterfalls.

Description
The advertisement call of males is a bird-like "chirp". In breeding sites, males greatly outnumber females and attempt to dislodge one another from the backs of females. Outside the breeding season adult Clinotarsus alticola are rarely encountered.

The caudal ocellus is a unique feature among ranid tadpoles. Its colouration may be aposematic.

References

Clinotarsus
Amphibians of Bangladesh
Amphibians of Myanmar
Frogs of India
Amphibians of Thailand
Amphibians described in 1882